International Mother Language Institute (IMLI) is statutory body in Bangladesh whose function is the preservation of languages.

History 
Declaration of 21 February as the International Mother Language Day by the United Nations on 17 November 1999 is an unprecedented event not only for the Bangla language but also in the history of all mother languages of the world. In a historic meeting commemorating this achievement on 7 December 1999 the honourable Prime Minister of the People's Republic of Bangladesh Sheikh Hasina announced that an international mother language institute would be established in Dhaka for the research and the preservation of the dignity and the rights  of augmenting/expanding as well as nearly extinct languages of the world. According to that declaration, she laid the foundation of the International Mother Language Institute (IMLI) at 1/ ka Segunbagicha, Dhaka, Bangladesh  on 15 March 2001. The then Secretary General of the United Nations Kofi A. Annan was present on that occasion. Honourable Prime Minister Sheikh Hasina inaugurated the newly constructed building of the International Mother Language Institute on the Martyrs' Day and International Mother Language Day, 2010. Since then, the International Mother Language Institute is moving ahead with its set mission and vision.

Construction started on 6 April 2003, stopped with the next change of government, and resumed on 11 February 2008. Six stories of the proposed twelve has been built. It was officially completed on 21 February 2010. In 2015 UNESCO applied Category II Institute status to IMLI.

Background
The Bengali language movement of 1952 and International Mother Language Day are the main inspiration behind the institute.

Structure 
There are 40 employees including researchers, officials and employees. Professor Hakim Arif is the present director general.

References

Buildings and structures in Dhaka
Language advocacy organizations
Cultural organisations based in Bangladesh
Research institutes in Bangladesh